Charles Piller is an American investigative journalist and author who writes for Science magazine as of July 2022. His focus is on health and biological warfare.

Journalism 
Prior to writing at Science, Piller was an associate editor at Macworld magazine and wrote for the Los Angeles Times, the STAT website, and The Sacramento Bee. At the Times, he investigated the impact of the Bill & Melinda Gates Foundation on Africa.

In July 2022, he authored an investigation published in Science that questioned the authenticity of images used in Sylvain Lesné's research on Alzheimer's disease at the University of Minnesota Medical School.

Center for Public Integrity 
Along with Charles Lewis and Alejandro Benes, Piller was a founding member of the Center for Public Integrity, where he served as board chair.

Books
 Gene Wars: Military Control over the New Genetic Technologies (with Keith R. Yamamoto), Beech Tree Books   
 The Fail-Safe Society: Community Defiance and the End of American Technological Optimism, University of California Press

Awards and honors

Piller was recognized with the 2016 Online Kavli Science Journalism Gold Award from the American Association for the Advancement of Science for an investigation of clinical trials, together with Natalia Bronshtein, while at STAT. In 2014, the First Amendment Coalition honored him with the Free Speech & Open Government Award for his Sacramento Bee investigation of construction of the San Francisco–Oakland Bay Bridge that led to legislative changes in California to enhance "transparency and accountability". Evident Change (formerly the National Council on Crime & Delinquency) recognized Piller, along with Deborah Anderluh and Amy Pyle, for 2010 reporting at The Sacramento Bee on "CA Prisons: Behavior Modification Experiments and Suppression of Due Process". In 2008, the American Society of Tropical Medicine and Hygiene awarded him, along with Doug Smith, their Communications Award for reporting in the Los Angeles Times of "Unintended Victims of Gates Foundation Generosity".

References

External links
 
 Science podcast July 22, 2022

Living people

Year of birth missing (living people)
American investigative journalists
Los Angeles Times people
20th-century American journalists
American male journalists
American male writers